The Bushman's Bride is a 1912 Australian silent film.

It is considered a lost film.

It was likely based on a play.

References

External links
The Bushman's Bride at IMDb

Australian black-and-white films
1912 films
Australian silent films
Lost Australian films